Tom Clancy's Ghost Recon Wildlands is a third-person tactical shooter video game developed by Ubisoft Paris in collaboration with Ubisoft Bucharest, Ubisoft Reflections, Ubisoft Montpellier, Ubisoft Annecy, Ubisoft Milan and Ubisoft Belgrade, and published by Ubisoft. It was released worldwide on March 7, 2017, for PlayStation 4, Windows, and Xbox One, as the tenth installment in the Tom Clancy's Ghost Recon franchise and is the first game in the Ghost Recon series to feature an open world environment.

The game moves away from the futuristic setting introduced in Tom Clancy's Ghost Recon Advanced Warfighter and instead features a setting similar to the original Tom Clancy's Ghost Recon. Ubisoft described it as one of the biggest open world games that they have published, with the game world including a wide variety of environments such as mountains, forests, deserts, and salt flats.

Tom Clancy's Ghost Recon Wildlands received generally mixed to positive reviews from critics. A sequel, Tom Clancy's Ghost Recon Breakpoint, was released on October 4, 2019.

Gameplay 

Tom Clancy's Ghost Recon Wildlands is a tactical cover based shooter game set in an open world environment and played from a third-person perspective with an optional first-person view for gun aiming. Players control members of the Delta Company, First Battalion, 5th Special Forces Group, also known as "Ghosts", a fictional elite special operations unit of the United States Army under the Joint Special Operations Command. It does not feature the futuristic setting used in Advanced Warfighter and Future Soldier, but instead adopts a modern-day setting, similar to the original Tom Clancy's Ghost Recon. As a result, the equipment featured in the game is based on weapons and gear commonly used by military forces around the world. It features some original equipment, such as drones that can be used to tag enemies and show objectives. These drones have limited abilities until upgraded. The game is the first entry to feature an open world environment, which consists of nine different types of terrain, such as: mountains, forests, desert, salt flats, and also introduces a dynamic weather system as well as a day-night cycle. Completing missions during day-time allows players to spot enemies easily, while completing missions at night grants players a tactical advantage, as the night offers players better concealment and easier infiltration due to some guardsmen being asleep. Players are tasked with making observations before carrying out missions. A variety of vehicles, such as dirt bikes, helicopters and dune buggies are featured in the game. Unlike its predecessors, Wildlands features several side-missions.

When completing missions, players can reach the location where the mission starts through a variety of ways. Players can parachute from a helicopter, walk overland, or drive towards their objectives. Players are allowed to use multiple ways to complete objectives, such as utilizing stealth, melee combat, or using long-ranged or short-ranged weapons provided in the game. The game features outposts that can be taken down by players. Players can grab enemies at close range with one hand for defense as human shields, while using the other hand to shoot. Players can gain experience points to level up. The playable character can be customized, and loot found on enemies' corpses can be equipped by player characters. Weapons and gear can be upgraded as well. According to the creative director of the game, the AI of the game is unscripted and has their "own motivations and agendas".

Each of the 21 areas on the map is controlled by a buchon, who is associated with one of four divisions of the cartel's operations: Influence, Security, Production and Smuggling. Clearing missions in an area and collecting key intel unlocks missions where players can target a buchon and eliminate him or her by killing or capturing the target (with some exceptions). Eliminating enough buchones in an operations division allows players to target that division's underboss, and eliminating that underboss and all of the buchones in an operations division leaves the division head vulnerable. Capturing this division head cripples and destabilizes the division and makes the cartel boss more vulnerable.

It features cooperative multiplayer mode, in which players can be joined by up to three other players to explore the game's world and to complete campaign missions. The game can be played solo, in which the player will be accompanied by three AI teammates, which the player can give orders to, if a player wants a more "lone wolf" playstyle they can be disabled via the settings. A competitive multiplayer mode has been released as part of a free update on October 10, 2017. It features an elimination type of game mode in a timed 4v4 match with revives. Players can level up through multiplayer gameplay which enables them to improve the different class of characters available.

Plot

Setting 
The game takes place in Bolivia in July 2019. The country has become increasingly unstable as a Mexican drug cartel known as the Santa Blanca Cartel gains control of several regions through the country. Led by the brutal and religious cartel boss El Sueño, the cartel gains more power and influence within and outside the country and turns Bolivia into the world's largest producer of cocaine. In an attempt to fight off Santa Blanca's armed occupation in their country, the government of Bolivia establishes La Unidad, an elite special forces group tasked with fighting the Cartel. Both factions eventually establish a truce to prevent more bloodshed after months of brutal fighting, with some of Unidad's personnel secretly working for Santa Blanca. DEA Agent Ricardo "Ricky" Sandoval is sent undercover in Santa Blanca in a joint operation with the CIA to gather intelligence on the Cartel, eventually working for El Sueño himself. The United States is compelled to act when a bomb targets the American embassy in La Paz and Sandoval is executed by the cartel after his cover is blown.

Campaign
A Ghost Recon fireteam is deployed to Bolivia as part of Operation Kingslayer, a joint operation between the CIA, DEA, and JSOC. The team consists of team leader and support gunner Nomad, vehicle and assault specialist Midas, hacker and tactical engineer Holt, and their sniper Weaver. The Ghosts enter Bolivia with their CIA contact, Karen Bowman, who was also a close friend to Sandoval. They meet Pac Katari, leader of the Kataris 26, the only resistance against Santa Blanca. Pac Katari requests they rescue Amaru, whose ideologies inspired the Kataris 26, from Santa Blanca. The Ghosts, with support from Bowman and the Kataris 26s, are free to tackle the cartel in any way they see fit.

The Ghosts dismantle the cartel piece by piece, targeting their four main operations by attacking drugs production facilities and stockpiles, disrupting smuggling operations, discrediting the cartel in the eyes of corrupt politicians and supporters, and inciting conflict between the cartel's senior figures. The team manage to capture or kill El Sueño's top lieutenants and their key subordinates to further weaken the cartel's grip over the region. El Sueño contacts the team and lures them to a meeting to meet face to face. The Ghosts hesitantly agree, but do not find El Sueño at the agreed location. El Sueño instead calls them via phone to bribe the Ghosts into working for him, though they refuse his offer and instead threaten him.

While dismantling the cartel, the team finds and collects audio tapes of agent Sandoval's reports to Bowman of his time working undercover for El Sueño. Sandoval's reports reveal that he had become deeply troubled by his mission, not only by the crimes he had committed to keep his cover but also by his superiors' reluctance to take action against the cartel. After recovering Sandoval's body from the cartel, Sueno contacts them again to offer them a tape of Sandoval's confession. Upon listening to it, they are disturbed to learn that Sandoval was responsible for the embassy bombing and framed Santa Blanca so that the United States government would be forced intervene in Bolivia. Though Bowman and the team are angered by Sandoval's deception, they decide to continue with the mission as the cartel still poses a threat.

After dismantling half of the cartel, Pac Katari claims his men have located El Sueño, but the Ghosts grow suspicious when they instead find the body of Amaru. Unable to contact Bowman, they find her captured by the Kataris 26 and Pac Katari breaks their alliance, claiming that the rebels must kill El Sueño themselves to avoid being seen as puppets of the United States. The Ghosts rescue Bowman and race to El Sueño's mausoleum to capture him before Pac Katari kills him. After fighting their way through both rebel and cartel opposition, the Ghosts and Bowman surround El Sueño, who has beheaded Katari. Despite his surrendering, Bowman receives a call from her superiors, informing that El Sueño had made a deal with the Department of Justice to give up the heads of other drug cartels in exchange for immunity and witness protection.

How the story ends depends on whether the Ghosts fully dismantled the cartel. If remnants of the cartel remain, Bowman will execute El Sueño, leading to her dismissal from the CIA and her arrest for murdering El Sueño. She expresses no regrets in doing so, fearing that El Sueño would become a dictator with the United States' backing. 

The canon ending occurs when the Ghosts have fully dismantled the cartel, Bowman takes El Sueño into protective custody. El Sueño provides further intelligence on other drug cartels, terrorist groups, and arms smugglers. Bowman predicts that when the intelligence runs out, El Sueño will either be extradited by Mexico or cut loose and start a new drug cartel, starting the cycle over again. She and the Ghosts resolve to prepare themselves for the next fight.

Downloadable content
Shortly after the game's release, Ubisoft announced plans to release two episodes of downloadable content, each with their own narrative set in Bolivia.

Narco Road

This episode sees the player take on the role of an unnamed Ghost sent undercover into Bolivia by the CIA to identify "El Invisible", the elusive head of Santa Blanca's smuggling network. The Ghost poses as a mercenary for hire and befriends the leaders of the gangs carrying out smuggling operations. Assisting the Ghost is CIA handler Karen Bowman and a local fisherman using the alias Señor Sonrisa, who is a CIA informant. Each gang leader provides clues to El Invisible's identity before the Ghost assassinates them. Eventually, the Ghost's notoriety grows to the point where El Invisible recruits them into Santa Blanca, erasing the Ghost's identity and staging their death. However, El Invisible is aware that the Ghost's true identity and has them imprisoned. The Ghost escapes and with the help from Señor Sonrisa, recovers the handheld device El Invisible uses to run Santa Blanca's smuggling network anonymously and seemingly kills El Invisible. When the device is decrypted, it unleashes a virus that compromises the CIA. The Ghost deduces that Señor Sonrisa is actually El Invisible, and that he orchestrated the operation to escape Santa Blanca, attack the CIA and disappear for good. Unable to explain Señor Sonrisa's motive for attacking them, the CIA spend the next two years tracking him. He is eventually found in Arizona and the Ghost is assigned a mission to kill him. The Ghost makes their way to Señor Sonrisa’s fishing cabin and assassinates him.

Fallen Ghosts

The second episode follows the Ghost Recon fireteam on their return to Bolivia. The cocaine trade has collapsed in the aftermath of Operation Kingslayer and with Pac Katari's death, the Kataris 26 have descended into in-fighting. In a bid to restore order, the Bolivian government has tried to rebuild the tactical police unit Unidad with special forces from across Latin America. Now known as "Los Extranjeros", these remnants of Unidad prove to be corrupt and seize control of cocaine production. When Sonsira's data breach in the CIA compromises the identities of every active agent in Bolivia, the Ghosts return to extract the compromised agents. Their mission goes awry when their helicopter is shot down moments after they enter Bolivian airspace. They regroup and rescue a CIA field officer code-named Socrates. As Los Extranjeros are better-armed, trained and organised than Unidad, extracting the compromised agents proves impossible. Socrates instead proposes that the Ghosts target Los Extranjeros' commanders and rebuild the Kataris 26. Their actions prompt Los Extranjeros' commanding officer, Colonel Merlo, to personally take charge of the remaining forces. When Merlo is killed, Los Extranjeros tears itself apart, and evidence of their crimes causes a political scandal that upends the Bolivian government. The Ghosts and Socrates depart, questioning whether this will be enough to change the course of Bolivia's future.

Special Operations

As part of the ongoing effort to support the game, Ubisoft released short-term Special Operations DLC.

Predator

The first pack, released in December 2017, features a mission to hunt the Predator. In the expansion, the team investigate several brutal killings in the forested areas of Bolivia, finding several skinned corpses and a crashed alien vessel until encountering the deadly Predator. After a lengthy battle, the team manage to defeat the Predator before it activates its self-destruct, killing itself in a massive explosion. The squad debate informing Bowman of the encounter, but ultimately choose to keep it to themselves. Due to an expiration in licensing rights with 20th Century Fox, the content is no longer available as of December 2020.

Operation Watchman
The next pack, Operation Watchman, features a tie-in with fellow Clancy series Splinter Cell, with actor Michael Ironside reprising the role of Sam Fisher. Fisher is deployed to Bolivia in order to recover sensitive intelligence data from a rogue CIA officer. Fisher has Fourth Echelon contact Bowman and borrow the Ghost team to assist in his mission. Fisher's deployment takes him to a Unidad base in La Cruz, where he infiltrates the base ahead of the Ghost team and assassinates the rogue agent prior to their arrival. Upon greeting Nomad, Fisher hacks into the Unidad servers in order to erase all traces of the sensitive information from Skell Technology while Nomad's team provides backup. While ex-filtrating from the base, Fisher reveals that the intelligence is data on sensitive research and development that could "change the future of warfare". Fisher has a debriefing with Bowman before deploying for his next mission to recover missing nuclear devices.

Operation Archangel
The 2018 DLC, Operation Archangel, features characters from another Clancy series, Tom Clancy's Rainbow Six – namely, operators from the Rainbow Six Siege multiplayer tactical shooter. The team intercepts a distress signal outside the city of Frontera and find a crashed truck surrounded by piles of cash and several dead cartel members. The team reports the massacre to Bowman, who informs them that Rainbow operative Taina "Caveira" Pereira of Brazil's Batalhão de Operações Policiais Especiais (BOPE) has recently gone AWOL from Team Rainbow and is suspected of killing several Santa Blanca gang members. Bowman then introduces the team to a friend of hers, Navy SEAL and fellow Rainbow operative Meghan J. "Valkyrie" Castellano, who requests the team's assistance in locating Caveira. Hoping to stop the rogue operative from potentially starting an international incident, Bowman and the team agree to help bring in Caveira.

The team soon meets a third Rainbow operative, Emmanuelle "Twitch" Pichon of France's GIGN (Groupe d'Intervention de la Gendarmerie Nationale), who requests the team bring her to the crash site. Their investigation leads them to a cartel outpost where they interrogate a Santa Blanca lieutenant, who reveals that Caveira is after someone named Dengoso. Twitch briefly parts ways with before rendezvousing with them at Dengoso's apartment in the hopes of finding any hints as to why Caveira's after him. A message on Dengoso's answering machine reveals that he is Caveira's younger brother João, and an undercover officer for the Federal Police of Brazil. Sent by his superiors to infiltrate Santa Blanca, Dengoso's cover had recently been blown and he is now being held captive by the cartel at a chemical institute. With Caveira already on her way to Dengoso's location, Twitch and the team catch up to her at the front gates and agree to assist her in rescuing Dengoso from Santa Blanca. The rescue is a success, though tensions rise between Team Rainbow and the Ghosts when Bowman demands Dengoso's cooperation in sharing anything he knows about El Sueno and his operations in Bolivia. Despite Caveira's insistence on leaving immediately with Dengoso, the latter agrees to cooperate with Bowman only with permission from his superiors. Nomad soon breaks the tension between both sides by allowing Dengoso to leave with Team Rainbow, much to Bowman's chagrin.

Rainbow Six Siege operators also feature in the January 2021 Amber Sky DLC for Breakpoint.

Operation Silent Spade
The winter 2018 DLC, Operation Silent Spade, released in December 2018 features characters from Tom Clancy's Ghost Recon: Future Soldier. Lieutenant Colonel Scott Mitchell, the team's commanding officer, temporarily reassigns them from Operation Kingslayer for an internal Ghost operation. Having found evidence of Russian Ultranationalist Forces working with Santa Blanca to mine deposits of weapons-grade uranium in Bolivia, Mitchell orders the team to rendezvous with the newest member of the Ghosts, John Kozak at a Unidad base to prevent the Russians from leaving Bolivia with the uranium. The mission is a success, but they soon discover that significant amounts of uranium are still unaccounted for. Nomad contacts Bowman, who leads them to a trainyard where the uranium was transported to. They learn that Santa Blanca plans to detonate a dirty bomb in Barvechos, a city that openly supports the rebels. With Kozak's help, the team attempts to disarm the bomb but is ultimately unable to, forcing them to drive it off a cliff into a mining area. With the bomb dealt with and the uranium accounted for, Mitchell and Kozak depart Bolivia.

Operation Oracle
Ubisoft announced another update on April 30, 2019, known as "Operation Oracle" featuring Jon Bernthal as Major Cole D. Walker, a Ghost Recon operative who becomes the antagonist of Tom Clancy's Ghost Recon Breakpoint. The update was released on May 2, 2019. Bowman gives Nomad's team a mission to infiltrate a Unidad facility in a railway tunnel on the Bolivian border. Upon entering the facility, the team find dead Unidad soldiers. Investigating further, they learn that the facility is being used to test drones reverse-engineered from classified Skell-Tech models that the Ghosts use. Nomad's team eventually encounter Cole D. Walker, a fellow Ghost, who has already infiltrated the facility and informs the team that a Skell-Tech engineer named Daniel Rodriguez Arellano has been selling classified information to Unidad and that Bowman is involved. They are attacked by Unidad soldiers and are forced to fight their way out of the facility. Though Walker insists Bowman cannot be trusted, Nomad persuades him to return Daniel to a safehouse to investigate Bowman's activities further. Upon dropping Daniel at the safehouse, Nomad and the team decide to tail Daniel. Eavesdropping on his phone calls, the team learn that Daniel is actually a CIA asset that has been compromised and that Unidad is threatening his family. Walker soon sets up a meet at an airfield where he shows Nomad the bodies of his team, who were killed by drones Daniel gave to Unidad and that Bowman is responsible for their deaths. Walker and Nomad go to a meeting between Bowman and Daniel, but find Unidad have captured Bowman and detained Daniel. Nomad interrogates Daniel who reveals that he sold out Bowman to Unidad to protect his family and Walker executes him. They regroup and infiltrate a nearby Unidad base to rescue Bowman. Escorting her to a safehouse, she claims that Daniel was part of a long-running CIA operation and she was his handler, but never knew the full extent of the mission. Despite their conflicting views on how to handle the situation, Nomad ultimately persuades Walker to trust their judgment on Bowman, as she has never given him a reason to doubt her.

Development
The development of Wildlands began in 2012, and was revealed in the end of Ubisoft's E3 2015 press conference. Ubisoft claimed that Wildlands would feature the largest open world environment the company has created. In order to create a realistic Bolivian environment, the developers visited Bolivia for two weeks and asked for consultation from local Bolivians. A modified version of the AnvilNext engine for supporting the large open world environments was used for the game.

Ubisoft released a 30-minute prequel short film titled Ghost Recon Wildlands: War Within the Cartel on February 16, 2017 on their Twitch channel and later on Amazon Prime. It stars Tip "T.I." Harris and was executive produced by Roberto Orci, Jay Williams, Noam Dromi and Orlando Jones through the production company Legion of Creatives. Avi Youabian directed the short.

Reception

Pre-release 
As the game was revealed at E3 2015, some critics called the announcement one of the most surprising reveals during E3. Wildlands was nominated for IGN's E3 2015 Game of the Show, Best PlayStation 4 Game, Best Xbox One Game and Best PC Game awards, and received one of GameSpot's Best of E3 2015 awards. It was also named the best co-operative and the best shooter by Game Informer in their Best of E3 2015 Awards.

The beta of the game was released on Steam and lasted from February 23 to February 27, 2017. On March 1, 2017, Ubisoft revealed that Tom Clancy's Ghost Recon Wildlands beta-phase had attracted more than 6.8 million players, making it its most successful beta to date.

Post-release 
Tom Clancy's Ghost Recon Wildlands received "generally favorable" reviews for the Xbox One version of the game, while the PlayStation 4 and PC versions received "mixed or average" reviews from critics, according to review aggregator Metacritic, selling four million copies in the first six months, alone.

The Guardian praised the size of the open world but noted the civilians seem not to bother much about the presence of armored men and, as the reviewer put it, "the warfare being waged around them". However The Guardian praised how the villains are written; they are "if not three- then at least two-dimensional characters". The Guardians reviewer appreciated the multiplayer, but wrote "By comparison, solo play can feel a little soulless".

Game Informer's reviewer was impressed by big and varied open world. He praised the thematic diversity of missions, however he writes that most of them boil down to clearing or infiltrating enemy bases.

Both The Guardians and Game Informer's reviewer noted that careful plans can be disrupted by enemy patrols. The Guardians reviewer stated that the shooting which then begins is not much in Tom Clancy's style. Game Informers reviewer wrote: "I appreciated how this x-factor makes you think on your toes, but I came to hate how frequently they [the patrolmen] appeared out of nowhere".

In conclusion The Guardian rated the game 3 out of 5 stars and Game Informer rated it 8.25 out of 10.

EGM reviewer was critical about the controls: "Aiming feels notably stiff and imprecise, even after aggressive fiddling with the game options" and "vehicle control feels far too loose". The EGM reviewer, however, praised array of gadgets, like drone and explosives, as well as support options like mortar strikes and vehicle drop-offs. Push Square, on the other hand, described the gadgets in the game as "the most uninteresting roster imaginable with even the most exciting – a parachute and mortar bombardment – failing to raise your pulse at all". Push Square considered the game has entertaining elements, namely: "a nice mix of stealth and action, a squad at your command, and enemies that'll mostly drop with a burst of bullets" however he felt the game does not "feel like a Ghost Recon game". He blamed the open world, which, as he admitted, has "some truly impressive environments", but results in making mission design and enemy AI worse.

GameStar praised varied scenery and sharp textures. They called the shooting "convincing" and praised multiplayer, both co-op as well as player vs player. However they criticised writing of the story, the dialogue and characters. In the end they scored the game 85 out of 100.

Destructoid reviewer wrote of missions which are very difficult to complete. USGamer reviewer partly agreed, writing about frustrating missions, but finding solutions for some missions which are "bending the rules of the game by doing something unrealistic, or that simply feels like cheating".

Destructoid reviewer, even though he listed various types of missions in the game, concluded: "Every mission is practically the same, both in terms of structure and context". USGamer agreed, writing: "the deeper I've gotten into the game, the more repetition I've begun to experience in terms of its missions".

Destructoid reviewer criticised the open world, even though he admits the graphics are fine: "Everything feels like a cheap movie set, rather than a detailed, lived-in world. Yes, the lighting is great and the vistas look beautiful, but none of that matters if the sandbox is little more than a stretch of land in between objective markers". Here, USGamer disagreed, writing: "Graphically stunning, absolutely massive, and packing some marvelous views and vistas, the developers at Ubisoft Paris have done an incredible job of creating a fantastic game world in which to play".

USGamer reviewer was amazed by the range of weapons to choose from, including additional accessories. In the end Destructoid gave 2.5 out of 10, and USGamer gave the game 4 out of 5.

Controversy
In March 2017, the Bolivian government expressed their dissatisfaction over the game's portrayal of their country as a violent narco-state, and filed a formal complaint to the French embassy in La Paz. Bolivia's Interior Minister Carlos Romero stated that the country has the standing to take legal action.

Ubisoft responded with the following statement; "Tom Clancy's Ghost Recon Wildlands is a work of fiction, similar to movies or TV shows. Like all Tom Clancy's games from Ubisoft, the game takes place in a modern universe inspired by reality, but the characters, locations and stories are all fantasies created solely for entertainment purposes. Bolivia was chosen as the background of this game based on its magnificent landscapes and rich culture. While the game's premise imagines a different reality than the one that exists in Bolivia today, we do hope that the in-game world comes close to representing the country's beautiful topography, and that players enjoy exploring the diverse and open landscapes it moved us to create."

Sales
Wildlands was the best-selling retail game in both the UK and the US in March 2017, surpassing competitors including Horizon Zero Dawn and The Legend of Zelda: Breath of the Wild. It was also one of the biggest video game launches in 2017, and it became the fastest-selling title in the Tom Clancy's franchise, behind Tom Clancy's The Division. Wildlands was revealed to be the seventh best-selling retail game in 2017 by the NPD Group. More than 15 million players have played the game since its release.

Awards 
The game was nominated for "Best Co-op Game" at PC Gamers 2017 Game of the Year Awards. It won the award for "Best Cooperative Multiplayer" at Game Informers Best of 2017 Awards, and also won the awards for "Best Setting" (Bolivia), "Best Comeback" in multiplayer, and "Best Cooperative Multiplayer" in their 2017 Shooter of the Year Awards. EGMNow ranked the game 23rd on their list of the 25 Best Games of 2017.

Sequel 
In early May 2019, Tom Clancy's Ghost Recon Breakpoint was announced during a livestream event. It serves as a sequel to 2017's Wildlands.

Notes

References

External links

 

2017 video games
Multiplayer and single-player video games
Open-world video games
PlayStation 4 games
PlayStation 4 Pro enhanced games
Tactical shooter video games
Tom Clancy games
Tom Clancy's Ghost Recon games
Ubisoft games
Video game controversies
Video games developed in the United Kingdom
Video games developed in France
Video games developed in Italy
Video games developed in Serbia
Video games developed in Romania
Video games set in 2019
Video games with alternate endings
Video games set in Bolivia
Video games featuring protagonists of selectable gender
Windows games
Works about Mexican drug cartels
Video games about the illegal drug trade
Xbox One games
Stadia games